Donovan's Brain is a 1942 science fiction novel by American writer Curt Siodmak.

The novel was an instant success and has been adapted to film three times. Since then the book has become something of a cult classic, with fans including Stephen King, who discussed the novel in his 1981 book Danse Macabre and mentions it in his novel/miniseries It. Siodmak later wrote a sequel in 1968 titled Hauser's Memory and wrote a final sequel in 1991 titled Gabriel's Body.

Publication history 
The novel was initially published as a three-part serial in the September - November 1942 issues of the pulp magazine Black Mask.  The first complete edition was published by Alfred A. Knopf in 1943, and it was provided to U.S. military personnel as an Armed Services Edition during World War II.  The work has since been translated into French, German, Portuguese, Italian, Japanese, and Dutch.

Plot 
The novel is written in the form of diary entries by Dr. Patrick Cory, a middle-aged physician whose experiments at keeping a brain alive are subsidized by Cory's wealthy wife.  Under investigation for tax evasion and criminal financial activities, millionaire megalomaniac W.H. Donovan crashes his private plane in the desert near the home of Dr. Cory.  The physician is unable to save Donovan's life, but removes his brain on the chance that it might survive, placing the gray matter in an electrically charged, oxygenated saline solution within a glass tank.  The brainwaves indicate that thought — and life — continue.  Cory makes several futile attempts to communicate with it.  Finally, one night Cory receives unconscious commands, jotting down a list of names in a handwriting not his own — it is Donovan's. Cory successfully attempts telepathic contact with Donovan's brain, much to the concern of Cory's occasional assistant, Dr. Schratt, an elderly alcoholic.

Gradually, the malignant intelligence takes over Cory's personality, leaving him in an amnesiac fugue state when he awakes.  The brain uses Cory to do his bidding, signing checks in Donovan's name, and continuing the magnate's illicit financial schemes.  Cory becomes increasingly like the paranoid Donovan, his physique and manner morphing into the limping image of the departed criminal.  Donovan's bidding culminates in an attempt to have Cory kill a young girl who stands in the way of his plans. Realizing he will soon have no control over his own body and mind, his assistant, Schratt, devises a plan to destroy the brain during its quiescent period.  Schratt resists the brain's hypnotic power by repeating the rhyme, "Amidst the mists and coldest frosts he thrusts his fists against the posts and still insists he sees the ghosts." Schratt destroys the housing tank with an axe and leaves the brain of Donovan to die, thus ending his reign of madness.  During the encounter, however, the brain, attempting to defend itself, orders Schratt's heart to stop beating.  Schratt dies, but bearing a look of fulfillment.

Adaptations 
Originally performed by Orson Welles in a 1944 radio play of the series Suspense, reprised in 1948 by John McIntyre. In 1982, the LP album release of the 1944 radio version of this story won the Grammy Award for Best Spoken Word Album.

The novel has been adapted for the screen three times — as The Lady and the Monster (1944), Donovan's Brain (1953), and The Brain (1962).

See also 

 Hauser's Memory

References

External links
 Orson Welles on Suspense — Internet Archive hosts MP3 recordings of the 1944 radio version.
  Radio adaptations of Donovan's Brain on Suspense

1942 American novels
1942 science fiction novels
American science fiction novels
Grammy Award for Best Spoken Word Album
American novels adapted into films
Alfred A. Knopf books